Aldo Perseke (born February 24, 1943) is a former Olympic butterfly swimmer from Brazil, who participated at one Summer Olympics for his native country.

At the 1959 Pan American Games in Chicago, he finished 4th in the 4 × 200-metre freestyle. He also swam the 1500 metre freestyle, not reaching the final.

At the 1960 Summer Olympics in Rome, he swam the 200-metre butterfly and the 4×100-metre medley, not reaching the finals.

References

1943 births
Living people
Brazilian male butterfly swimmers
Swimmers at the 1959 Pan American Games
Swimmers at the 1960 Summer Olympics
Olympic swimmers of Brazil
Swimmers from Rio de Janeiro (city)
Pan American Games competitors for Brazil
20th-century Brazilian people